Yangibazar may refer to:

Yangibazar, Tajikistan
Yangibozor, Tashkent Region, Uzbekistan
Yangibozor, Bukhara Region, Uzbekistan
Jangy-Bazar (disambiguation), several places in Kyrgyzstan

See also
 Yangibozor (disambiguation)